Insiders were an American rock band from Chicago, Illinois.

The group played locally in the Chicago area in the mid-1980s, and was initially courted by Warner Bros. Records before signing with Epic and releasing a debut album in 1987. That album, Ghost on the Beach, peaked at #167 on the Billboard 200 on the strength of a single also titled "Ghost on the Beach", which reached #8 on the Billboard mainstream rock singles chart. The group eventually left Epic and signed with independent label Monsterdisc, releasing two albums for the label in the 1990s.

Members
John Siegle - vocals, guitar
Gary Yerkins - vocals, guitar
Jim DeMonte - bass
Ed Breckenfeld - drums
Jay O'Rourke - guitar

Discography
Ghost on the Beach (Epic, 1987)
Not for Sale (Monsterdisc, 1993)
Fate in Action (Monsterdisc, 1994)

References

Musical groups from Chicago
Rock music groups from Illinois